Domesticum may refer to:

Plants
 Lansium domesticum, a synonym of Lansium parasiticum, a species of fruit-bearing tree
 Philodendron domesticum, the spadeleaf philodendron or Burgundy philodendron, a plant species
 Pelargonium × domesticum, the Regal variety or French geranium, a plant species

Animals
 Trypodendron domesticum, a beetle

See also
 Including use as a species name
  List of Latin and Greek words commonly used in systematic names
 Domestica (disambiguation)
 Domesticus (disambiguation)